Antonio Bartolomeo Spinacuta was an Italian (Venetian) tightrope walker, acrobat, singer, and dancer. He is often referred to as Spinacuta. He was married to the Swedish actress Helena Pettersson. He toured Sweden in 1784–1787, where he had a remarkable success and aroused considerable fame. In 1786, he released the first hot air balloons in Sweden. In 1795, he was noted to be active at the Ricketts company circus in Philadelphia in US.

Notes

References 
 Flodmark, Johan: Stenborgska skådebanorna. Bidrag till Stockholms teaterhistoria. Stockholm. Norstedt & söner. 
  Fredrik August Dahlgren: Förteckning öfver svenska skådespel uppförda på Stockholms theatrar 1737-1863 och Kongl. Theatrarnes personal 1773-1863. Med flera anteckningar.

Tightrope walkers
18th-century Italian singers
18th-century American people
Year of birth missing
Year of death missing
Place of birth missing
Italian male singers
Gustavian era people
18th-century theatre managers
18th-century circus performers
Italian circus performers
Acrobats